The Vale languages, or Ruto–Vale, comprise a small number of languages spoken by a few tens of thousands of people in the Central African Republic and perhaps Chad. They are members of the Central Sudanic language family. 

The most populous Vale language is Ruto (Lutos), spoken by twenty thousand people. The other clearly related language is Vale (with its Tana variety perhaps a third).

Footnotes

References
Roger Blench (n.d.) Nilo-Saharan language listing

Bongo–Bagirmi languages
Languages of the Central African Republic